The Leipzig Marathon is an annual marathon race over the classic distance of 42 km and 195 metres held in the city of Leipzig, Germany since 1977. The event began as an East German competition and it hosted the German Democratic Republic's national championship on four occasions (1985, 1986, 1987, and 1990).

Past winners
Key:

Men

Women

References

List of winners
 Leipzig Marathon. Association of Road Racing Statisticians (2011-04-18). Retrieved on 2011-04-22.

External links
 Official website
 Race profile at Marathon info

Recurring sporting events established in 1977
Marathons in Germany
Marathon
1977 establishments in East Germany
Inline speed skating competitions